Acetic anhydride, or ethanoic anhydride, is the chemical compound with the formula . Commonly abbreviated , it is the simplest isolable anhydride of a carboxylic acid and is widely used as a reagent in organic synthesis. It is a colorless liquid that smells strongly of acetic acid, which is formed by its reaction with moisture in the air.

Structure and properties

Acetic anhydride, like most acid anhydrides, is a flexible molecule with a nonplanar structure. The pi system linkage through the central oxygen offers very weak resonance stabilization compared to the dipole-dipole repulsion between the two carbonyl oxygens. The energy barriers to bond rotation between each of the optimal aplanar conformations are quite low.

Like most acid anhydrides, the carbonyl carbon atom of acetic anhydride has electrophilic character, as the leaving group is carboxylate. The internal asymmetry may contribute to acetic anhydride's potent electrophilicity as the asymmetric geometry makes one side of a carbonyl carbon atom more reactive than the other, and in doing so tends to consolidate the electropositivity of a carbonyl carbon atom to one side (see electron density diagram).

Production
Acetic anhydride was first synthesized in 1852 by the French chemist Charles Frédéric Gerhardt (1816-1856) by heating potassium acetate with benzoyl chloride.

Acetic anhydride is produced by carbonylation of methyl acetate:
 

The Tennessee Eastman acetic anhydride process involves the conversion of methyl acetate to methyl iodide and an acetate salt. Carbonylation of the methyl iodide in turn affords acetyl iodide, which reacts with acetate salts or acetic acid to give the product. Rhodium chloride in the presence of lithium iodide is employed as catalysts. Because acetic anhydride is not stable in water, the conversion is conducted under anhydrous conditions.

To a decreasing extent, acetic anhydride is also prepared by the reaction of ketene (ethenone) with acetic acid at 45–55 °C and low pressure (0.05–0.2 bar).
 
(ΔH = −63 kJ/mol)

The route from acetic acid to acetic anhydride via ketene was developed by Wacker Chemie in 1922, when the demand for acetic anhydride increased due to the production of cellulose acetate.

Due to its low cost, acetic anhydride is usually purchased, not prepared, for use in research laboratories.

Reactions
Acetic anhydride is a versatile reagent for acetylations, the introduction of acetyl groups to organic substrates.

Acetylation of alcohols and amines
Alcohols and amines are readily acetylated. For example, the reaction of acetic anhydride with ethanol yields ethyl acetate:

Often a base such as pyridine is added to function as catalyst. In specialized applications, Lewis acidic scandium salts have also proven effective catalysts.

Acetylation of aromatic rings
Aromatic rings are acetylated by acetic anhydride.  Usually acid catalysts are used to accelerate the reaction. Illustrative are the conversions of benzene to acetophenone and ferrocene to acetylferrocene:

Preparation of other acid anhydrides
Dicarboxylic acids are converted to the anhydrides upon treatment with acetic anhydride.  It is also used for the preparation of mixed anhydrides such as that with nitric acid, acetyl nitrate.

Precursor to geminal diacetates
Aldehydes react with acetic anhydride in the presence of an acidic catalyst to give geminal diacetates.  A former industrial route to vinyl acetate involved the intermediate ethylidene diacetate, the geminal diacetate obtained from acetaldehyde and acetic anhydride:

Hydrolysis
Acetic anhydride dissolves in water to approximately 2.6% by weight. Aqueous solutions have limited stability because, like most acid anhydrides, acetic anhydride hydrolyses to give carboxylic acids. In this case, acetic acid is formed, this reaction product being fully water miscible:

Applications
As indicated by its organic chemistry, acetic anhydride is mainly used for acetylations leading to commercially significant materials. Its largest application is for the conversion of cellulose to cellulose acetate, which is a component of photographic film and other coated materials, and is used in the manufacture of cigarette filters. Similarly it is used in the production of aspirin (acetylsalicylic acid), which is prepared by the acetylation of salicylic acid. It is also used as an active modification agent via autoclave impregnation and subsequent acetylation to make a durable and long-lasting timber.

In starch industry, acetic anhydride is a common acetylation compound, used for the production of modified starches (E1414, E1420, E1422)

Legal status 
Because of its use for the synthesis of heroin by the diacetylation of morphine, acetic anhydride is listed as a U.S. DEA List II precursor, and restricted in many other countries.

Safety
Acetic anhydride is an irritant and combustible liquid; it is highly corrosive to skin and any direct contact will result in severe burns. Because of its reactivity toward water and alcohol, foam or carbon dioxide are preferred for fire suppression. The vapour of acetic anhydride is harmful.

References

External links
ICSC 0209
NIOSH Pocket Guide to Chemical Hazards

Carboxylic anhydrides
Lachrymatory agents
Solvents
Acetylating agents